Real World: Ex-Plosion is the twenty-ninth season of MTV's reality television series Real World, which focuses on a group of diverse strangers living together for several months in a different city each season, as cameras follow their lives and interpersonal relationships. It is the eighth season of Real World to be filmed in the Pacific States region of the United States, specifically in California after The Real World: San Diego in 2011.

The season featured a total of twelve cast members over the course of the season. It is the seventh season to take place in a city that had hosted a previous season, as the show's third season was set in San Francisco in 1994. It is also the sixth season to be located in California. San Francisco, California was first reported as the location for the twenty-ninth season in August 2013. The house in San Francisco that was being used was first reported by the website Vevmo. Production began from late August until October 21, 2013, and the season later premiered on January 8, 2014, consisting of 12 episodes.

After 21 years, this season marks the first significant change in the show's format. The cast narration "This is the true story...of seven strangers..." that was used during the previous 28 seasons was eliminated from the opening title sequence and replaced with a new introduction. The roommates move into their San Francisco home, develop relationships with one another and with the San Francisco locals. A month into the show, the cast goes on an off-the-grid vacation. When they return, they come to discover that many of their exes have moved in as additional roommates. The Exes were each misled by producers to believing that they would be a replacement roommate, unaware the other Exes would be moving in as well until move-in day.

Season changes
In order to boost ratings, the producers made major change in the show's format. Besides bringing the cast members' exes into the house, the season included new graphics and a new filming style that added a new layer of realism by featuring the inclusion of the cameramen, conversations between the producers and the cast in and out of interviews and discussions about the fact that the cast are filming a show. The production crew also provided the cast a smart phone so they could take their own pictures, and also had a social website available that they could post their pictures on. As the season unfolds, some of that will have repercussions at home when people back home see photos. The house's phone room has a ooVoo setup for video calls.

Employment
Most seasons of The Real World since the fifth season have included the assignment of a season-long group job or task to the housemates. Beginning in the 28th season, certain jobs in the area were approved by production that the cast had the liberty to apply for independently if desired. However, unlike last season, no cast member this season chose to take part in this particular work. Ashley Ceaser has a full-time job at a San Francisco start-up that she continues during production, Arielle works on her ongoing projects as a filmmaker, and Jenny auditions for and gets hired to be a gogo dancer.

The residence
During shooting, the cast lived at 1244 Sutter Street between Polk Street and Van Ness Avenue, the former location of the Avalon Ballroom.

Cast
This was the first season of Real World to feature twelve cast members consisting of seven original roommates and five additional roommates.  The season started off with seven roommates, until one roommate left early. Later, the cast was joined by five additional roommates. The additional roommates were known as The Exes, people who the originals had previously dated.

 Age at time of filming

Duration of Cast 

Notes

Episodes

After filming
The Real World: Ex-Plosion Reunion aired on April 7, 2014. It was hosted by Girl Code star Nessa, and featured the entire cast, as they discussed their time during filming and their lives since the show ended.

Since filming, Cory returned to Los Angeles and is currently a trainer. He is working on his brand and is working on his own health website. He still keeps in touch with Lauren, who is back in Michigan. Jenny also returned to Los Angeles and got back together with Brian, who moved in with her. Jamie and Thomas returned to Texas, and Jamie still models, bartends and spends most of her time with Thomas. Thomas graduated from college and hopes to become a dentist one day. Arielle returned to Oakland, where she still models and still aspires to be a horror filmmaker. She is still with Ashley, although they don't see each other often ever since Ashley moved closer to her job. Jay went back home to New York City and spends more time with his father in the wake of his mother's death. He is focused on his watch line and is donating half of the proceeds to cancer research. He and Jenna are not together.

Among the topics discussed were the tension between Jenny and Cory, while the entire cast gave their opinions on Jenny and Brian's volatile relationship which makes Jenny break down due to what she went through during growing up. Lauren's pregnancy was also brought up but she did not give too much details away. Jamie and Thomas' current relationship was also discussed and everyone found out the reason why Jamie and her ex, Cameron broke up and why she did not want him on the show as they got to hear from him. The love triangle between Thomas, Jamie, and Hailey was also discussed as they all seem to get along now. When asked why they broke up, Jenna revealed that Jay was acting inappropriately with his ex-girlfriend and that she can no longer trust him. The cast also called Jay out for being a shady liar during their time in the house with Arielle stating that she does not want to have fake friends. The original Ashley is brought out and talks about her insecurity, the regret she feels about ripping up Jay's phone numbers which cost him time with his mother. The feud between Ashley and Jamie is also discussed and they agree that they will never be friends. Ashley is apparently living in Paris with her boyfriend, Francis. The reunion also featured Ashley's ex-fiancée, who would've moved in the house if Ashley had stayed. The cast talked about the season finale and how Jenny seems to think that Brian was possessed by a demon during the last night. Lastly, they talked about who would want to compete on The Challenge.

On July 31, 2015, Jenny gave birth to her and Brian's first child, their daughter Violet Marie.

In 2017, Cheyenne Floyd from Are You the One? gave birth to her and Cory's daughter, Ryder. In 2018, they joined the cast of Teen Mom OG and, in the subsequent year, they also appeared on How Far Is Tattoo Far? Wharton also appeared on the first season of Ex on the Beach with ex-girlfriend Alicia Wright. There he met his current girlfriend, Taylor Selfridge. On April 22, 2020, Wharton and Selfridge welcomed their first daughter, Mila Mae. A Teen Mom OG special episode was planned for the occasion, but was pulled off the air after some 2012 racially insensitive tweets from Selfridge resurfaced online. On June 1, 2022, Selfridge gave birth to the couple's second daughter, Maya Grace.

Jay was featured in episode 18 of the seventh season of Catfish: The TV Show.

In 2019, Jenna Compono got engaged to Zach Nichols from The Real World: San Diego. The two first met on the 26th season of The Challenge and appeared on multiple seasons together afterwards. In 2021, Nichols and Compono announced they were expecting their first child. After postponing the wedding to 2022 due to the COVID-19 pandemic, the couple had a more intimate ceremony on March 13, 2021. Their first son, Anthony Joseph Nichols, was born on September 2, 2021. On December 27, 2022, the couple welcomed daughter Liliana Marie.

Ashley Ceasar was a cast member on the fourth season of Ex on the Beach with former girlfriend and Real World: Skeletons alumna Nicole Zanatta. The couple later appeared on True Life Presents: Quarantine Stories.

Ashley Mitchell was a cast member on the dating show Match Me If You Can.

The Challenge

Challenge in bold indicates that the contestant was a finalist on the Challenge.

Note: Ashley M. made an appearance on Vendettas for an elimination.

References

External links
 Official site. MTV.com
 Real World Ex-Plosion Trailer. MTV.com

Ex-Plosion
Television shows set in San Francisco
2014 American television seasons
Television shows filmed in California